David O. Selznick (1902–1965) was an American motion picture producer whose work consists of three short subjects, 67 feature films, and one television production made between 1923 and 1957. He was the producer of the 1939 epic Gone With the Wind. Selznick was born in Pittsburgh and educated in public schools in Brooklyn and Manhattan. He began working in the film industry in New York while in his teens as an assistant to his father, jeweler-turned-film producer Lewis J. Selznick. In 1923, he began producing films himself, starting with two documentary shorts and then a minor feature, Roulette (1924). Moving to Hollywood in 1926, Selznick became employed at Metro-Goldwyn-Mayer (MGM), where he produced two films before switching to Paramount in early 1928. After helping to guide Paramount into the sound era, Selznick moved to RKO Radio in 1931 where he served as the studio's executive producer. During his time at RKO he oversaw the production of King Kong (1933) and helped to develop Katharine Hepburn and Myrna Loy into major film stars.

In 1933 Selznick returned to MGM, this time as a vice-president in charge of his own production unit. During his two years with the studio he produced elaborate versions of Leo Tolstoy's Anna Karenina and Charles Dickens' David Copperfield and A Tale of Two Cities. In 1935, he left MGM to form his own production company, Selznick International Pictures, where he produced adaptations of Robert Smythe Hichens' The Garden of Allah (1936), Frances Hodgson Burnett's Little Lord Fauntleroy (1936), Anthony Hope's The Prisoner of Zenda (1937), and Mark Twain's The Adventures of Tom Sawyer (1938). Selznick also became a pioneer in the use of Technicolor with the first and last of these films and also with his productions of A Star Is Born and Nothing Sacred (both 1937). In 1939, Selznick brought Swedish actress Ingrid Bergman to the United States to star in Intermezzo and the following year he brought Alfred Hitchcock over from England to direct Rebecca. Also in 1939, Selznick produced his epic version of Margaret Mitchell's Gone With the Wind, which became the most financially successful film of all time.

Selznick liquidated his corporation in the early 1940s but returned to independent producing in 1943. His work from this period included two more Hitchcock films, Spellbound (1945) and The Paradine Case (1948) and several films starring Jennifer Jones, among them Since You Went Away (1944), Duel in the Sun (1946) and Portrait of Jennie (1948).  Selznick ceased his independent productions in 1948. Beginning with Carol Reed's The Third Man (1949), he entered into a period of co-producing motion pictures with other filmmakers.  In 1954, he made his sole venture into television with the production Light's Diamond Jubilee. Selznick retired from filmmaking after producing an adaptation of Ernest Hemingway's A Farewell to Arms (1957).

Selznick's productions were the recipients of numerous Academy Award nominations. Two of his films—Gone With the Wind and Rebecca—won Academy Awards for Best Picture. Six other films that he produced—Viva Villa! (1934), David Copperfield (1935), A Tale of Two Cities (1935), A Star is Born (1937), Since You Went Away (1944), and Spellbound (1945)—were nominated for Best Picture. As of 2013, four of the films Selznick produced have been added to the National Film Registry: King Kong (1933), The Prisoner of Zenda (1937), Gone With the Wind (1939), and The Third Man (1949). For his work in motion pictures, Selznick received a star on the Hollywood Walk of Fame.

Filmography 
The release dates, titles, and names of the directors for Selznick's films are derived from the filmographies presented in the books Memo From David O. Selznick by Rudy Behlmer and David O. Selznick's Hollywood by Ronald Haver.  The quotes are derived from Behlmer's book.

Early shorts 
Selznick began working in the film industry while in his early teens.  He was employed—after school hours—by his father, film producer Lewis J. Selznick, initially as head of publicity and advertising and later as a newsreel film editor. When the elder Selznick went bankrupt in 1923, young David took a job as a promoter for a two-reel short about prizefighter Luis Firpo. Afterwards he convinced the Mineralava Beauty Clay Company to produce a two-reel film of a beauty contest they were sponsoring with actor Rudolph Valentino as the judge.

Aetna-Selznick Distributing Corporation

Metro-Goldwyn-Mayer (I) 

In October 1926, Selznick secured a job at Metro-Goldwyn-Mayer as a script reader for producer Harry Rapf.

After the McCoy Westerns, Selznick was assigned as assistant to producer Hunt Stromberg on the film White Shadows in the South Seas (1928). Disagreements with Stromberg and senior producer Irving Thalberg over the choice of the film's director (W. S. Van Dyke or Robert J. Flaherty) led to Selznick's termination with the company.

Paramount Pictures 

In early 1928 Selznick accepted the position of assistant to producer B. P. Schulberg at Paramount Studios.  The professional relationship between the two, however, eventually deteriorated after Schulberg went to Europe for several months in 1929.  During his absence, studio head Jesse L. Lasky placed Selznick into Schulberg's position and decided to keep him there.  Selznick remained with Paramount until his resignation in June 1931.

Selznick worked in a variety of jobs (i.e. supervisor, producer, associate producer, executive producer, or substantial contributor).  The 13 films listed below were those whose production he was known to be heavily involved in. Except where noted these films are all-talking.

RKO Pictures 

In 1931 Selznick and director Lewis Milestone attempted to form their own production company. After several months, however, the two were unsuccessful in achieving financial backing.  Milestone eventually accepted an offer to because head of production at United Artists while Selznick accepted a similar position at RKO Radio.

As Vice-President in Charge of Production, Selznick was personally involved in the 22 RKO films listed here.

Metro-Goldwyn-Mayer (II) 
After refusing to sign a new contract with RKO, Selznick returned to MGM in 1933, this time in the position as vice-president in charge of his own unit. During the next two years he personally produced 11 features for the studio before departing to form his own production company.

Selznick International Pictures 

In 1935 Selznick left MGM to form his own production company, Selznick International Pictures. He also took over the operation of Pioneer Pictures, a production company designed to produce films in Technicolor and formed by his friend and ex-associate (at RKO) Merian C. Cooper. Selznick International produced a total of 11 features, of which all but one were distributed by United Artists.  Gone with the Wind was released by MGM as part of a deal with Selznick in exchange for the loan of Clark Gable in the role of Rhett Butler.

Vanguard Films, Selznick Releasing Organization 
Following the highly successful releases of Gone With the Wind and Rebecca, Selznick began a three-year liquidation of Selznick International Pictures in order to draw profits for himself and his outside investors. He developed and sold film projects to other producers and studios, and arranged loan outs of his contracted artists. Without outside backers he formed David O. Selznick Productions, Inc., which in 1941 became owner of one-fourth of United Artists.

Selznick established a film production company, Vanguard Films (1943–1951). The first three features for his new company were distributed by United Artists. In 1946 Selznick broke with UA over the distribution of Duel in the Sun, and founded his own distribution company, Selznick Releasing Organization.

Final productions 

In 1949 Selznick closed down his production facilities and he greatly reduced the staff of Selznick Releasing Organization. He and Jennifer Jones began traveling in Europe and were married in July 1949. For the remainder of his career he collaborated with other film producers and also made his sole venture into television.

Academy Awards 
Of the 68 features that Selznick produced 22 received a total of 82 Academy Award nominations with 21 wins. In addition to these Selznick himself was twice nominated for the Irving G. Thalberg Memorial Award.  He won the second of these two nominations.

Footnotes

References 
Primary
 

Secondary

External links 

 

American filmographies